Karel Petr (14 June 1868, Zbyslav, Austria-Hungary – 14 February 1950, Prague, Czechoslovakia) was a Czech mathematician. He was one of the most renowned Czech mathematicians of the first half of the 20th century.

Biography
Petr is known for the Petr–Douglas–Neumann theorem in plane geometry, which he proved in 1908, and was independently rediscovered by Jesse Douglas in 1940 and Bernhard Neumann in 1941.

Eduard Čech was a doctoral student of Petr at Charles University in Prague. Petr's doctoral students also included Bohumil Bydžovský and Václav Hlavatý.

See also
Petr–Douglas–Neumann theorem

External links
MacTutor Entry (in Czech)

1868 births
1950 deaths
People from Kutná Hora District
People from the Kingdom of Bohemia
Czech mathematicians
Charles University alumni
Academic staff of Charles University